Emilio Jorge Rodríguez (born 1947) is a Cuban essayist and literary critic.

Early life 

Not much is known about his childhood or the time leading up to his time spent at university, except that he was born in 1947 on the Caribbean island of Cuba. Rodríguez earned a degree in Spanish and Latin American Literature at the University of Havana. At the time of graduation, Rodríguez also earned a degree/grade as a researcher at the Cuban Academy of Sciences.

Professional life 
Rodríguez is renowned for being an essayist, literary critic, literary researcher, literary interpreter, and a literary compiler. He specializes in the study of Caribbean literature and Creolization in Caribbean oral and written discourse.

Rodríguez conducted research at Casa de las Américas Literary Research Center and at the Center of Caribbean Studies during 1972–2000. He was also the director of the Center of Caribbean Studies during 1994–1998.  Rodríguez also has served on the board for Scientific Degrees at the Cuban Literature and Linguistic Institute. In addition, he was a part of the awards jury member for Casa de las Américas, the National Culture Award, and the International Orality Contest. Rodríguez is the founder/editor of Anales del Caribe for the years 1981–2000. He is also member on the editorial board of Revista Mexicana del Caribe, Academic Committee of the Biblioteca del Caribe Series and the Unión de Escritores y Artistas de Cuba.

Rodríguez has also contributed to the Encyclopedia of Caribbean Literature of 2006, and has also written and published many anthologies of Caribbean writers.

Anales del Caribe (1979–) is a magazine/production created by Rodríguez, in collaboration with the Casa de las Américas Center for Caribbean Studies. The purpose of the magazine is to conduct research of the art and literature of the Caribbean and its corresponding diasporas.

Awards 

 1986: Razón de Ser  
 2014: Este Caribe Nuestor at Havana University 
 2017: Casa de las Américas Prize in the category "Studies on the Black Presence in Contemporary America and the Caribbean" for Una Suave, tierna línea de Montañas Azules (which explores the relations between Haitians and Cubans) 
 CUNY Caribbean Fellowship
 Fundación Nicolás Guillén Fellowship 
 Latin American and Caribbean Third Millennium Essay Award 
 Selected for the Visiting Scholars' Program of Africana Studies and Research Center at Cornell University

Publications 

Rodríguez has a total of 21 works in 49 publications in various languages, including Spanish (38 publications), French (2 publications), and English (6 publications).

Books: 
 Literatura caribeñas; bojeo y cuanderno de bitácora (1989)
 Religiones afroamericanas (1996) 
 Acriollamiento y discurso escrit/oral caribeño (2001)
 Trans-Caribbean Literary Identity / Haiti y la transcaribenidad Literaria (2011) 
 El Caribe Literario, Trazados de convivencia (2011)
 Haïti et l'identité littéraire trans-caribéenne (2013) 
 Una Suave, tierna línea de montañas azules (2017. Casa de las Américas Prize)

Book contributions:
 Panorama hisórico – literario de nuestra América (1982)
 América Latina: Palavara, Literatura, e Cultura (1995)
 Diccionario Enciclopédico de las Letras de América Latina (1996) 
 Defining New Idioms as Alternative Forms of Expression (1996)
 A History of Literature in the Caribbean (1997) 
 Spain's 1898 Crisis (2000)
 A Pepper Pot of Cultures; Aspects of Creolization in the Caribbean (2003)
 La oralidad: ¿ciencia o sabiduría popular? (2004)
 Encyclopedia of Caribbean Literature (2006) 
 Corazón de pelícano – Antología poética de Lasana M. Sekou / Pelican Heart – An Anthology of Poems by Lasana M. Sekou Edited by Emilio Jorge Rodríguez (2010)

Anthologies edited by Rodríguez:
 Efrain Huerta 
 Pedro Juan Soto 
 Cuentos para ahuyentar el turism: 16 autores puertorriqueños

His writings have also appeared in several magazines, newspapers, and journals, including Bim, Caribbean Quarterly, Revue Internationale de Littérature Comparée,  Del Caribe, Gacetaole Cuba, and Letras Cubanas.

Literary analysis 

Rodríguez is noted for his work in the area of Caribbean literature and the creolization in Caribbean oral and written discourse, and he has written six publications exploring these concepts, although his work has been mostly editorial, literary research, and literary compilation of writings by other Caribbean authors. "Rodríguez is not so much a literary critic as a literary historian," wrote J. Michael Dash of New York University in a book review of Rodríguez's Haiti and Trans-Caribbean Identity.

Rodríguez's books explore the relations between Caribbean islands but specifically home in on Haitian relations. In Haiti and Trans-Caribbean Identity, he explores relations between Haiti and Cuba through a series of essays based on famous Haitian authors such as Fernand Hibbert, Jacques Stephen Alexis, Alejo Carpentier, and Nicolás Guillén. "The only writers who meet Rodríguez's approval are those in whom the 'revolutionary and the artist' merge," noted Dash. Rodríguez believes that there needs to be a greater importance and recognition of the relations and interactions between Haiti and its neighboring countries post-Haitian revolution (1791–1804). He explores how a sort of "creolization" is occurring through the noted culture sharing/blending between Haitians and Cubans. 

Although Rodríguez has won several notable awards for his work in this area of study, he has also been criticized for focusing heavily on Haiti's relations with its Hispanic counterparts. "The geographical reach of the essays can hardly be called 'trans-Caribbean' when the real focus appears to be the literary contacts between Haiti and the Hispanic Caribbean," notes Dash. In addition to the criticism of his area-specific analysis, Dash notes a note of bias in Rodríguez's work. "At times more commissar than critic, his ultimate approval or disapproval depends on whether the novelist does or does not 'understand class struggle' (p. 146)."

References 

Casa de las Américas. N.p., n.d. Web. 15 April 2017. <http://www.casa.co.cu/revistaanales.php>.

Dash, J. Michael. Book Reviews. N.p.: n.p., n.d. Web. 15 April 2017.

"Emilio Jorge Rodríguez and Reynaldo García Blanco Win 2017 Casa de las Américas 	Awards." Repeating Islands. N.p., 27 January 2017. Web. 18 April 2017.<https://repeatingislands.com/2017/01/27/emilio-jorge-rodriguez-and-reynaldo-garcia-	blanco-win-2017-casa-de-las-americas-awards/>.

"Latest News." Emilio Jorge Rodrígue, Caribbean Literature Expert Wins Prestigious Casa de		 las Américas Prize. N.p., n.d. Web. 18 April 2017.<http://www.mnialive.com/articles/emilio-jorge-rodrigue-caribbean-literature-expert-	wins-prestigious-casa-de-las-americas-prize>.

"Latest News." Emilio Jorge Rodríguez receives Caribbean lifetime award in Cuba. N.p., n.d. 	Web. 18 April 2017. <http://www.mnialive.com/articles/emilio-jorge-rodriguez-receives- caribbean-lifetime-award-in-cuba>.

Rodríguez Emilio Jorge | Archives | Congrès international des écrivains de la Caraïbe. N.p., n.d. Web. 18 April 2017. <http://ecrivainsdelacaraibe.com/en/archives/author-	info/rodriguez-emilio-jorge.html>.

Rodríguez, Emilio Jorge. ""Two lines of development" … between Haiti and its neighbors By 	Emilio 	Jorge Rodríguez | The Bajan Reporter." Web's Eye View of Barbados in the 	Caribbean. 	N.p., 9 January 2014. Web. 18 April 2017. 	<https://www.bajanreporter.com/2014/01/two-	lines-of-development-between-haiti-	and-its-neighbors-by-emilio-jorge-rodriguez/>.

"Rodríguez, Emilio Jorge 1947–." [WorldCat Identities]. N.p., 1 January 1970. Web. 18 April 2017. 	<http://www.worldcat.org/identities/lccn-n92-16866/>.

"Welcome to House of Nehesi Publishers." House of Nehesi Publishers. N.p., n.d. Web. 18 	Apr. 2017. <http://www.houseofnehesipublish.com/authors/emiliorodriguez.html>.

1947 births
Date of birth missing (living people)
Living people
Cuban essayists
Cuban literary critics